Amington is a suburban village, parish and ward, in Staffordshire, England. Formerly a distinct village, it is now part of the Tamworth borough, with no gap between it and the neighbouring wards of Bolehall, Glascote, Glascote Heath and Stonydelph.

History
Amington and Stonydelph formerly formed one "township" and were part of the ancient parish of Tamworth. Amington, now in Staffordshire, was previously part of the county of Warwickshire; the county boundary between Staffordshire and Warwickshire formerly running along Tamworth high street. The village became part of Tamworth Rural District in 1932, thus becoming part of the administrative county of Staffordshire.  The village became part of Tamworth Borough in 1965.

The village's Parish Church, St. Editha's, is a chapel-of-ease, part of Tamworth Parish. However, as formerly in Warwickshire, Amington church falls under the Diocese of Birmingham, whereas its mother church in Tamworth, also dedicated to St. Editha, is part of the Diocese of Lichfield.

Amington is the site of Amington Hall. On the eve of the English Civil War there was some opposition to the paying of poor rate levies from the local gentry, in particular Cecil Warburton, the occupant of the Hall. The justices at the quarter sessions for Easter, 1642 heard that Cecil Warburton of Hall End, Amington, “did lock up the overseer of the poor (George Payne)…and drew his sword upon him there in a very outrageous manner”.

Transport
Amington is near the Coventry Canal, the River Anker, and also the Trent Valley Line of the West Coast Main Line, all of which pass east/west just to the north of the village.

Amenities
In the village there are two convenience stores, Tesco Express and Premier. There is also a post office and a fish and chip shop.

Amington has four pubs: The Gate Inn, The Old Liberal, The Amington Inn and The Winning Post.

In the 1990s two developers built a 1000-home estate in the village which is now known as Amington Fields. In 2006, Antler Homes built a 17-house estate named Ashby Grange.

In 2016 work began on the development of over 1100 new homes on the site of the former Tamworth Municipal Golf Course.

Landau Forte Academy, Amington, one of the high schools in Tamworth, is situated in Amington.  The school reached national headlines in 2016 when one of the pupils was recorded being assaulted.

Local Culture
Amington Band are a traditional British brass band based in their own band room. They have been associated with the village since the 1910s

Media 
Tamworth Informed serves the area as a media source via their dedicated news website.

See also
Listed buildings in Tamworth, Staffordshire

References
Warwick County Record Office, Quarter Sessions Order Book Vol. I p. 43.

Notes

Villages in Staffordshire
Areas of Tamworth, Staffordshire